Bach the Detective (French: Bach détective) is a 1936 French comedy film directed by René Pujol and starring Bach, Ginette Leclerc and Paul Bernard. The film's sets were designed by the art director Emile Duquesne.

Synopsis
Narcisse works as a doorman for a firm of jewellers, but dreams of becoming a private detective. Het gets his break when he is employed by a detective agency and is able to clear the nephew of his former boss who has been wrongly accused of theft.

Cast
 Bach as Narcisse  
 Paul Bernard as André  
 Monique Bert as Mag  
 Ginette Gaubert as Olga Worskaïa  
 Louis Florencie as Baudry  
 Armand Lurville as Lesueur  
 Jacques Dumesnil as Stefani  
 Ginette Leclerc as Zita 
 Georges Prieur as Durandel  
 Georges Morton as Olive  
 Edmond Castel as M. Estrade  
 Simone d'Arche as Dora  
 Jules Moy as L'usurier  
 Alexandre Mihalesco as L'extra  
 Andrée Champeaux as L'amie du baron  
 Rachel Devirys as La maîtresse de maison  
 Yvonne Yma as Madame Estrade  
 Georges Tréville as Le baron  
 Jean Brochard as Le voyageur indisposé  
 Ky Duyen as Le complice de Stefani  
 Myno Burney as Vendeuse de la bijouterie 
 Gabriel Farguette as Le fils de l'aubergiste  
 René Novan as Tony  
 Marcel Loche as Le domestique de Dora  
 Albert Brouett as Un élève chez Lesueur  
 Albert Broquin as Le distributeur de prospectus  
 Paul Demange as M. Dubois  
 Albert Malbert as Le gendarme  
 Léon Larive as L'aubergiste

References

Bibliography 
 Dayna Oscherwitz & MaryEllen Higgins. The A to Z of French Cinema. Scarecrow Press, 2009.

External links 
 

1936 films
French comedy films
1936 comedy films
1930s French-language films
French black-and-white films
Films directed by René Pujol
1930s French films